Patrick Van Antwerpen was a Belgian author-filmmaker born on 17 May 1944 in Ixelles (Brussels) and died in this commune on 3 December 1990.

Filmographie 

 Jules, Julien, Julienne (1968)
 La baraque (1970)
 Le banc (1973)
 L'autobus (1974)
 Lismonde (1978)
 L'air du large (1979)
 Un joli petit coin (1980)
 Rue de l'arbre unique (1983)
 Vivement ce soir (1985)
 Le monde des Spocks (1988), film d'animation réalisé avec des enfants de l'atelier Graphoui
 Jeux d'enfants (1990), film documentaire de 40 minutes, tourné en Hi-8 transféré en 16mm, sur des enfants fréquentant les centres d'expression et de créativité de la Communauté française de Jette et Mouscron. Le montage a été terminé après la décès du cinéaste par Béatrice Haché, son assistante depuis 1987.
 Gilles Ehrmann photographe, inachevé en raison de la mort du cinéaste

References

External links
 
 

Belgian film directors
1944 births
1990 deaths